This article lists songs of the C vs D "mash-up" genre that are commercially available (as opposed to amateur bootlegs and remixes). As a rule, they combine the vocals of the first "component" song with the instrumental (plus additional vocals, on occasion) from the second. The commercially available version of the mash-ups that do not use the original performer's vocals have been noted. Additionally the songs marked with an asterisk (*) were released using only the first song's name. Also noted is the inclusion of any other element.

References

Lists of songs